George Hueu Sanford Kanahele (1930–2000) was a native Hawaiian activist, historian and author.

Biography
George Hueu Sanford Kanahele was born October 17, 1930, in Kahuku on the island of Oahu of Hawaii.
Kanahele graduated from Kamehameha Schools in 1948, and served as missionary for the Church of Jesus Christ of Latter-day Saints in Japan until 1954. He then served in the United States Army Security Agency in Germany. 

Kanahele received his Bachelor's and master's degrees in political science from Brigham Young University Hawaii, and Ph.D. in Government and Southeast Asian Affairs from Cornell University in 1967, graduating from Cornell with academic honors. 

Kanahele published several books during his life relating to Hawaiian culture and history. As co-founder of the Hawaii Entrepreneurship Training & Development Institute, he trained indigenous people around the world in how to start sustainable businesses.

Kanahele founded of the Native Hawaiian Hospitality Association in 1997. Despite being a valuable part of the Hawaiian activism movement, some of his ideas are controversial, such as his argument that native Hawaiians should embrace Hawaii's tourism by helping the visitor industry revive a "Hawaiianess," also described as "a Hawaiian sense of place," in visitor destinations such as Waikīkī. In 1998 he received the Living Treasures of Hawai'i award.

He died in Guam on September 14, 2000, after a heart attack while teaching a seminar.

Publications
  Ph.D. Dissertation

References 

1930 births
2000 deaths
Brigham Young University–Hawaii alumni
Cornell University alumni
Kamehameha Schools alumni
Native Hawaiian writers